Leptomenes is a mainly Afrotropical genus of potter wasps. It was previously a much larger genus, though many species have been transferred to other genera such as Eumenidiopsis, Stroudia, and Tachymenes.

Species
The following species are included in Leptomenes:

 Leptomenes convexus Giordani Soika, 1987 
 Leptomenes cribratus Giordani Soika, 1983
 Leptomenes eumenoides (Smith, 1857)
 Leptomenes extremus Gusenleitner, 2005
 Leptomenes laethificus Giordani Soika, 1941
 Leptomenes major Giordani Soika, 1977
 Leptomenes pulawskii Gusenleitner, 1997
 Leptomenes richardsi Giordani Soika, 1975
 Leptomenes schulthessianus (de Saussure, 1890)
 Leptomenes stevensoni Giordani Soika, 1977
 Leptomenes ugandensis Giordani Soika, 1940

References

Biological pest control wasps
Potter wasps
Hymenoptera genera